Peter Morgan Pennoyer FAIA (born on February 19, 1957) is an architect and the principal of Peter Pennoyer Architects, an architecture firm based in New York City. Pennoyer, his four partners and his fifty associates have an international practice in traditional and classical architecture, or New Classical Architecture. Many of the firm's institutional and commercial projects involve historic buildings, and the Institute of Classical Architecture & Art has stated that the firm's strength is in "deftly fusing history and creative invention into timeless contemporary designs."

The firm's projects have been featured in publications such as The New York Times, Architectural Digest, The Wall Street Journal, Elle Decor, and House & Garden.

In October 2010, the Vendome Press published Peter Pennoyer Architects: Apartments, Townhouses, Country Houses, which featured twenty of the firm's projects, and in 2016, Vendome published A House in the Country, which chronicled the process used by Pennoyer and his wife, interior designer Katie Ridder, to design their own house and garden in Millbrook, New York.

Early life and education
Peter Pennoyer was born on February 19, 1957, in New York City, the son of Victoria (née Parsons) Pennoyer (1928-2013), and Robert Morgan Pennoyer (born 1925). His father was a partner at Patterson Belknap, a former Assistant U.S. Attorney for the Southern District of New York, and a former Assistant to the Assistant Secretary of Defense for International Security Affairs. Pennoyer graduated from St. Bernard's School in New York City and St. Paul's School in Concord, New Hampshire, received a Bachelor of Architecture degree from Columbia College in 1981, and a Masters of Architecture degree from Columbia Graduate School of Architecture, Planning and Preservation in 1984. His siblings include Russell Pennoyer, Christina Lee Pennoyer (the wife of R. Scott Greathead), and Dr. Tracy Pennoyer (the wife of John Auchincloss, a son of author Louis Auchincloss).

Pennoyer is the grandson of Frances (née Morgan) Pennoyer, and the lawyer Paul Geddes Pennoyer; a great-grandson of J.P. Morgan Jr.; and a great-great grandson of J.P. Morgan. Pennoyer's maternal grandfather, James R. Parsons, was a partner in Chubb & Son, and his great-grandfather Hendon Chubb was a founding partner of Chubb & Son.

Career

While in graduate school from 1981 to 1983, Pennoyer worked as a designer in the Manhattan office of his Columbia professor, Robert A. M. Stern. He established his own practice in 1984, where he was a principal in the firm Pennoyer Turino Architects P. C. until 1990, after which he formed Peter Pennoyer Architects.  One of his earliest projects was a retreat in the Catskill Mountains for his sister's father-in-law, Louis Auchincloss.

Pennoyer is a trustee of The Morgan Library & Museum, and president of the Whiting Foundation, which sponsors the Whiting Awards, a literary awards program. He is Chairman of the Fellowship Committee for the Sir John Soane's Museum Foundation, a National Peer Reviewer of the U.S. General Services Administration, Washington D.C., and a lifetime member of the Society of Architectural Historians. He was chairman of the board of The Institute of Classical Architecture & Art from 2009 to 2013.

Since 2011, Pennoyer has been an adjunct professor in the Department of Art History: Department of Urban Design and Architecture Studies at New York University.

Published works
Pennoyer and historian Anne Walker co-authored five monographs of American architectural history: The Architecture of Delano & Aldrich; The Architecture of Warren & Wetmore; The Architecture of Grosvenor Atterbury; New York Transformed: The Architecture of Cross & Cross; and Harrie T. Lindeberg and the American Country House. He and Walker also wrote the introduction to a reprint of Frank M. Snyder’s Building Details.

Recognition
The Institute for Classical Architecture & Art (ICAA) gave Pennoyer's firm its Stanford White Award for the design of a house in Dutchess County, New York (2012), its Stanford White Award, for the design of a new apartment building on Manhattan's Upper East Side and for a new house in Maine (2016), its Bulfinch Award (to Preserve and Advance the Classical Tradition in New England) for its design of a new classical house in Massachusetts (2017).

In 2017, the College of Charleston awarded Pennoyer its Albert Simons Medal of Excellence. In 2017, the Institute of Classical Architecture & Art gave the firm the Arthur Ross Award for architecture.

Peter Pennoyer Architects has been included regularly in Architectural Digest's AD100 List, a listing of outstanding talent in architecture and interior design. The firm is included in New York Spaces Top 50 Designers List, and in Ocean Home magazine's Top 50 Coastal Architects list.

Pennoyer was elected to the College of Fellows of the American Institute of Architects in 2014, and to the General Society of Mechanics and Tradesmen in 2016.

Representative projects
Peter Pennoyer Architects’ projects include the following:

 Wolong Bay Development, Dalian, China
 151 East 78th Street, New York City
 Classical Villas, The Peak, Hong Kong
 Counter Proposal for the New York Public Library
 The Metropolitan Opera Club, New York City
 New York Genealogical and Biographical Society, New York City
 The New York Stock Exchange Luncheon Club, New York City
 Historic Hudson Valley, Pocantico Hills, New York
 David Webb, New York City Flagship Store
 The Mark Hotel, New York City
 Hodsoll Mckenzie, London
 Pop Shop, Keith Haring, New York City
 The Factory, Andy Warhol
 The Hotchkiss School, The Monahan Gymnasium, Connecticut
 Oakley Farm, Virginia
 Diamond A Ranch, New Mexico
 Moynihan Train Hall Clock

Personal life
In 1988, Pennoyer married Katherine Lee "Katie" Ridder, the daughter of Constance Ridder, a lawyer, and Paul Anthony Ridder, a director of Knight Ridder, and the granddaughter of Bernard Ridder, the former chairman of Knight Ridder.  They have three children: Jane, Anthony, and Virginia, and reside in Bronxville, New York in a house designed in the 1920s by the architect Charles Lewis Bowman, a former McKim, Mead & White draftsman.

References

External links
Peter Pennoyer Architects
Peter Pennoyer Amazon Author Page

1957 births
Living people
Morgan family
St. Bernard's School alumni
St. Paul's School (New Hampshire) alumni
Columbia College (New York) alumni
Columbia Graduate School of Architecture, Planning and Preservation alumni
New Classical architects
20th-century American architects
21st-century American architects
Ridder family